Bishan Mendis (born 10 November 1999) is a Sri Lankan cricketer. He made his Twenty20 debut on 4 March 2021, for Kalutara Town Club in the 2020–21 SLC Twenty20 Tournament. He made his List A debut on 26 March 2021, for Kalutara Town Club in the 2020–21 Major Clubs Limited Over Tournament.

References

External links
 

1999 births
Living people
Sri Lankan cricketers
Kalutara Town Club cricketers
Place of birth missing (living people)